Lara Harris is an American model and actress.

Harris studied French in Paris and began her career there as a model. She was the face of Armani fragrance Gio, appearing in their TV commercial directed by David Lynch, and also of Ultima II for Revlon, Banana Republic, and Oil of Olay.

Harris returned to the United States to continue her studies at The New School, New York, but soon changed from literature to acting. She was featured in national advertisements, including Herb Ritts' commercial Pasha for Cartier in 1994.

Harris is known for film appearances in No Man's Land, The Fourth War, The Fisher King, Singles, Demolition Man and All Tied Up. She has also started directing, writing and producing films, and won "Best Short Film" at the Aspen Comedy Festival for her first film, 9 1/2 Minutes.

Harris continued her studies with a graduate course in psychology and is a psychotherapist in addition to acting and modeling.

Filmography

Television appearances

Awards 
 "Best Short Film", Aspen Comedy Festival for 9 1/2 Minutes.

Notes

References

Sources

External links 
 
 

Living people
American film actresses
American television actresses
Female models from Illinois
Actresses from Chicago
Year of birth missing (living people)
21st-century American women